William McGill is the name of:

William McGill (politician) (1814–1883), Scottish member of the Ontario Provincial Parliament
Willie McGill (1873–1944), American major league baseball pitcher
William J. McGill (1922–1997), American psychologist and university administrator
Bill McGill (1939–2014), basketball player
Bill McGill (baseball) (1880–1959), American baseball pitcher in Major League Baseball

See also
William Gill (disambiguation)
McGill (surname)